Women's association football is a largely amateur sport in Italy, given the greater emphasis of the male competitions.

History
In February 1933, in Milan, the Feminine Football Group (Gruppo Femminile Calcistico) was formed as the first organized women's football club; the girls played on the pitch wearing petticoats. However, the activity lasted only about 9 months because, after the enthusiasm given by the release of the news on Calcio Illustrato which published an entire page with the photos of the Milanese girls, other girls' teams were set up in different cities. To prevent the "phenomenon" from taking hold, the Italian National Olympic Committee (CONI) prevented women from being able to play not only tournaments but above all individual competitions, hijacking female footballers in various athletic sports.

In 1946 two teams were formed in Trieste: Triestina and San Giusto. Four years later in Naples, the Italian Football Women's Association (Associazione Italiana Calcio Femminile) was formed, which continued its activities until 1959. However, an official championship was yet to be formed.

In 1968 the Italian Women's Football Federation (Federazione Italiana Calcio Femminile, FICF) was born: the Italian championship was played with two groups of five teams and in the final in Pisa the first championship was awarded to A.C.F. Genova, who won against Roma. This situation of stability lasted only two years: indeed, on 31 January 1970, ten clubs decided to abandon the FICF and formed the Italian Federation of Female Football (FFIGC). 

In 1970 the FFIGC hosted the first unofficial football Women's World Cup, also known as the Martini Rosso Cup. The tournament was organized entirely without the involvement of FIFA or any of the common national associations. Seven teams appeared in the tournament with Boldklubben Femina, representing Denmark, beating Italy 2–0 in the final to win the title.

In 1972 a 45-team qualifying championship was held divided into four groups. The Serie B, the only regional level, was transformed into the national league which was given the name of Interregional Serie A (Serie A Interregionale) in the first 3 years. With an interregional Serie C being inaugurated, in 1983 the foundations were laid for the development of youth categories, constituting the Esordienti championship in 1979 (which in 1982 became the Serie D). However, it was only in 1986 that women's football lost its autonomy and enters the ranks of the Italian Football Federation (FIGC). 

The national activity was developed as follows: the Serie A with 16 participating teams and single round; the Serie B divided into three groups of 14 teams. The Supercoppa was set up to be played between the winners of the Italian Women's Cup and the Serie A championship. In 1998, the clubs participating in the Serie B were divided into 4 groups of 12 teams with final playoffs to identify the three winners who would enter the Serie A. While previously run by the Lega Nazionale Dilettanti (LND), starting from the 2018–19 season the Serie A and Serie B championships have been run by the FIGC.

League
The league system is divided into five tiers: Serie A and Serie B as single divisions, Serie C divided into four groups, and Eccellenza and Promozione divided into further regional groups.

National divisions

Serie A 
The Serie A is a tournament that takes place between 12 teams. The team that gets the most points during the season wins the league title and qualifies for the UEFA Women's Champions League. The 2nd place team also earns a place in the UEFA Women's Champions League. Two teams are relegated to the Serie B.

Serie A is growing in professionalism as women's football. Many professional women's teams started in the 1970s.

Serie B 
The Serie B (formerly Serie A2) is the second division of women's football in Italy. The league is made up of 12 teams competing in a single round. The first two classified are promoted directly to the Serie A, while the last two are relegated directly to the Serie C. The ninth and tenth ranked go through a relegation play-off with the Serie C teams that came out defeated by the promotion playoffs.

Serie C 
Starting from the 2018–19 season, the Serie C became the third division with an interregional national championship consisting of four groups of 12 or 14 teams. The first ranked of each group play in the promotion play-off, in which the two winners are promoted to the Serie B. The two losing teams play a play-off with the ninth and tenth place in Serie B to determine who should participate in the Serie B the following season.

Regional divisions 
The remaining structure of the Italian football league is divided into two more levels. The first of each division are promoted to the one above. Both championships are organized by the Lega Nazionale Dilettanti (LND):

 Eccellenza
 Promozione

National team

The women's national team has had mixed results as team although they have qualified for FIFA Women's World Cup and UEFA Women's Championship. 

Italy participated at the inaugural World Cup of 1991 where, after two wins and a loss in the group stage, they qualified for the quarter-finals, where they lost against Norway. After having failed to qualify for the second edition, Italy played in the 1999 edition where they didn't go past the group stages. For the following four editions, between 2003 and 2015, Italy failed to qualify for the World Cup, coming close in 2015 after losing in the final match of qualification to Belgium. In 2019, Italy returned to the World Cup after a 20-year absence.

See also
 Football in Italy

References

 
Football in Italy